The 2009 Crown Royal presents the Russ Friedman 400 was the tenth race in the 2009 NASCAR Sprint Cup Series, which took place on May 2, 2009 at the Richmond International Raceway in Richmond, Virginia.

Entry list

Qualifying

Race recap
Brian Vickers won his second pole position of the season. Kyle Busch won the 400 lap race in his Toyota on his 24th birthday, with Tony Stewart, Jeff Burton, and Ryan Newman following. In total, there were 15 caution flags during the course of the race. Busch also won the NASCAR Nationwide Series race the previous day. This would also be the final start for Jeremy Mayfield, as he was suspended by NASCAR soon after for failing the drug policy rule.

Results

Television coverage 
The race was telecast on Fox/Speed starting at 7 PM US EDT, because of baseball with radio coverage on Sirius Satellite Radio and MRN beginning at 7:30 PM US EDT.

References 

Crown Royal 400
Crown Royal 400
NASCAR races at Richmond Raceway
May 2009 sports events in the United States